Shargacucullia is a genus of moths of the family Noctuidae.

Species
 Shargacucullia anceps (Staudinger, 1881)
 Shargacucullia armena (Ronkay & Ronkay, 1987)
 Shargacucullia barthae (Boursin, 1933)
 Shargacucullia blattariae (Esper, 1790)
 Shargacucullia brevipennis (Hampson, 1984)
 Shargacucullia canariensis (Pinker, 1969)
 Shargacucullia caninae (Rambur, 1833)
 Shargacucullia celsiphaga (Boursin, 1940)
 Shargacucullia erythrocephala (Wagner, 1914)
 Shargacucullia eugrapha (Boursin, 1942)
 Shargacucullia falcata (Ronkay & Ronkay, 1987)
 Shargacucullia faucicola (Wiltshire, 1943)
 Shargacucullia gozmanyi Ronkay & Ronkay, 1994
 Shargacucullia kasyi (Wiltshire, 1976)
 Shargacucullia lychnitis (Rambur, 1833)
 Shargacucullia macewani (Wiltshire, 1949)
 Shargacucullia mediogrisea (Warren, 1911)
 Shargacucullia naumanni (Ronkay & Ronkay, 1992)
 Shargacucullia notodontina (Boursin, 1934)
 Shargacucullia osthelderi (Boursin, 1933)
 Shargacucullia prenanthis (Boisduval, 1840)
 Shargacucullia reisseri (Boursin, 1933)
 Shargacucullia scrophulariphaga (Rambur, 1833)
 Shargacucullia scrophulariphila (Staudinger, 1859)
 Shargacucullia scrophulariae (Denis & Schiffermüller, 1775)
 Shargacucullia sinopsis (Boursin, 1942)
 Shargacucullia stigmatophora (Hampson, 1894)
 Shargacucullia strigicosta (Boursin, 1940)
 Shargacucullia thapsiphaga (Treitschke, 1826)
 Shargacucullia tropicarabica (Wiltshire, 1949)
 Shargacucullia verbasci (Linnaeus, 1758)
 Shargacucullia xylophana (Boursin, 1934)
 Shargacucullia zerkowitzi (Boursin, 1934)

Shargacucullia Gallery

References
 Shargacucullia at funet.fi

Cuculliinae